Pilkhana also named as Pilakhna, is a village and a nagar panchayat in Aligarh district in the Indian state of Uttar Pradesh.

Demographics
As of the 2001 Census of India, Pilkhana had a population of 9692. Males constitute 53% of the population and females 47%. Pilkhana has an average literacy rate of 28%, lower than the national average of 59.5%: male literacy is 37%, and female literacy is 17%. In Pilkhana, 22% of the population is under 6 years of age.

References

Cities and towns in Aligarh district